Patrick Tighe, FAIA, FAAR is an American architect and interior designer based in Los Angeles, California. He is the founder and principal of Tighe Architecture. Tighe was born in Lowell, Massachusetts. He received a Master of Architecture with Distinction from UCLA. Tighe worked for Frank O. Gehry & Associates, and was an associate of Thom Mayne’s Morphosis Architects for 7 years before leaving to found Tighe Architecture.

Patrick Tighe was awarded the prestigious Mercedes T. Bass Rome Prize in Architecture, the American Institute of Architects' Young Architect Award. Tighe is a Fellow of the American Academy and The MacDowell Colony. Tighe was elected to the College of Fellows of the American Institute of Architects for "notable contributions to the advancement of the profession of architecture.” In 2019,Tighe was inducted into the Interior Design Magazine Hall of Fame. Tighe is currently an adjunct professor at the University of Southern California and has previously held teaching positions at UCLA and the Southern California Institute of Architecture.

Tighe has produced work that has been published in over 20 countries and recognized internationally, including The New York Times, Architectural Digest, Architect Magazine, Interior Design, Newsweek, Wallpaper, Metropolis, Architectural Record, and many other publications.

The firm has received the professions highest honors and has exhibited Internationally including the 2013 Museum of Contemporary Art, Los Angeles' "A New Sculpturalism: Contemporary Architecture from Southern California". The work of the firm has been shown at the Venice Biennale and solo shows include “Dopplegangers” at the A+D Museum, Los Angeles and “Out of Memory”, an immersive sound installation consisting of a parabolic spray foam structure milled on site using robots. The project was realized in conjunction with composer Ken Ueno for the SCI Arc Gallery in Los Angeles and was recognized with a National Honor Award from the American Institute of Architects.

In 2016, Tighe authored “Building Dichotomy”, published by Images, a monograph of the firm's work.

Significant Projects

References

External links

UCLA School of the Arts and Architecture alumni
University of Massachusetts Amherst alumni
Architecture firms based in California
Artists from Lowell, Massachusetts
Living people
Architects from Los Angeles
Year of birth missing (living people)
Architects from Massachusetts